In nuclear physics, the symmetry energy reflects the variation of the binding energy of the nucleons in the nuclear matter depending of its neutron to proton ratio as a function of baryon density. Symmetry energy is an important parameter in the equation of state describing the nuclear structure of heavy nuclei and neutron stars.

References

Nuclear physics